Synclera himachalensis is a moth in the family Crambidae. It was described by H. R. Pajni and H. S. Rose in 1978. It is found in Himachal Pradesh, India.

References

Moths described in 1978
Spilomelinae